Rashid Ali Buttar (born January 20, 1966) is a British-born American conspiracy theorist and licensed osteopathic physician in Charlotte, North Carolina, who is a known anti-vaxxer. He is known for his controversial use of chelation therapy for numerous conditions, including autism and cancer. He has twice been reprimanded by the North Carolina Board of Medical Examiners for unprofessional conduct and cited by the U.S. Food and Drug Administration (FDA) for illegal marketing of unapproved and adulterated drugs.

Background
The son of Pakistani parents, Buttar was born in London in 1966. He immigrated with his parents to the U.S. at the age of 9 and grew up in rural Rosebud, Missouri. He attended Washington University, graduating with a bachelor's degree in biology and religion, and then earned a Doctor of Osteopathic Medicine degree from University of Osteopathic Medicine and Health Sciences in Des Moines, Iowa.

Buttar has made the claim of being board certified by several entities, all of which are listed as "questionable organizations" by Quackwatch including the American Academy of Preventative Medicine, American Academy of Integrative Medicine, and American College for Advancement in Medicine; the latter's primary purpose being the promotion of chelation therapy.

In 1998, Buttar launched and served as medical director for Medical Spa and Rejuvenation Center, a provider of massage services, in Huntersville, North Carolina.

In 2007, Buttar was brought before the North Carolina Board of Medical Examiners, accused of unprofessional conduct for providing ineffectual therapies to four cancer patients. Three of those patients later died. Following public hearings in 2008, the panel recommended that Buttar's license "be suspended indefinitely" and that he be prohibited from treating children or patients with cancer, but stayed the decision, ultimately giving Buttar a formal reprimand in 2010 while allowing him to continue to practice.<ref>Garloch, Karen. (April 25, 2008). "Medical panel: Restrict doctor", The Charlotte Observer. Archived from the original on May 7, 2008.</ref>"Huntersville doctor accepts reprimand, keeps unorthodox work" (March 31, 2010). WBTV. Retrieved April 13, 2020.

Buttar has been criticized for his use of chelation therapies, such as topical cream containing chelators to treat children with autism, and for his use of intravenous hydrogen peroxide and EDTA to treat cancer. He came to public attention in 2009 when he alleged to have successfully used chelation therapy to treat Desiree Jennings, a Washington Redskins cheerleading ambassador who had made dubious claims about suffering from dystonia and losing her ability to walk or talk normally after receiving a flu shot. Reporting on the case, Discover'' described Buttar as a "a prominent anti-vaccine doctor who treats 'vaccine damage' cases".

In July 2009, Buttar and his wife Debbie achieved the rank of "blue diamond" within the distributor network of the multi-level marketing company Monavie, which sold an acai-based beverage until going into foreclosure in 2015.

In April 2010, the FDA sent Buttar a warning letter for illegally marketing unapproved topical creams as drugs via his websites, YouTube videos, and radio appearances. FDA inspections also revealed that Buttar's company, V-SAB Medical Labs, had not complied with good manufacturing practices and that its products were adulterated according to the Federal Food, Drug, and Cosmetic Act.

In 2011, as a result of the disciplinary action in North Carolina, the Hawaii Medical Board denied Buttar a medical license.

In 2019, the North Carolina Medical Board disciplined Buttar after receiving two complaints. In one case, a physician was worried that Buttar's treatment of a cancer patient hindered appropriate treatment and increased the patient's pain and suffering. In the other case, Buttar admitted that his personal relationship with the parent of a young patient constituted a boundary violation. Buttar and the Medical Board settled the complaints in a Consent Order that included a reprimand and a requirement to take courses in ethics and recordkeeping. Buttar acknowledged that his conduct constituted "unprofessional conduct including, but not limited to, departure from or the failure to conform to the ethics of the profession." Additionally, regarding the cancer patient, Buttar acknowledged that his documentation of care "failed to conform to the standards of acceptable and prevailing medical practice".

In March 2021, an analysis by the Center for Countering Digital Hate of Twitter and Facebook anti-vaccine content found Buttar to be one of the top twelve individual and organization accounts producing up to 65% of all anti-vaccine content on the platforms.

COVID-19 conspiracy theories and misinformation

During the 2019-20 coronavirus pandemic, a series of videos featuring Buttar were posted to YouTube by the fake news website Next News Network. In these videos, Buttar advanced a conspiracy theory claiming that NIAID director Anthony Fauci's research helped to create COVID-19. He made many other false claims, such as that 5G cell phone networks and "chemtrails" cause COVID-19. YouTube removed the video a week after it was posted, replacing it with a message saying, "This video has been removed for violating YouTube’s Community Guidelines."

Buttar promotes anti-vaccination videos sold by Ty and Charlene Bollinger and receives a commission whenever his referrals result in a sale, a practice known as affiliate marketing.

See also

List of unproven and disproven cancer treatments
Quackery
Snakeoil

References

External links
 Ask Dr. Buttar
 Center for Advanced Medicine & Clinical Research (Rashid A. Buttar, D.O.)

American physicians of Pakistani descent
Alternative cancer treatment advocates
Alternative detoxification promoters
Autism pseudoscience
American osteopathic physicians
American conspiracy theorists
Health fraud
Living people
Physicians from North Carolina
Pseudoscientific diet advocates
1966 births
COVID-19 conspiracy theorists
5G conspiracy theorists
American anti-vaccination activists